The following is a list of bands, past and present, who have had recordings released on the Relapse Records label (this list includes artists on the Release Entertainment subsidiary as well as artists from the now defunct merger with Nuclear Blast America during the 1990s):

Current artists

Former artists

Affiliated artists
Largely artists for whom the label have either reissued old releases of or for whom Relapse are the licensees for the North American market

References 

Relapse Records